Max Mirnyi and Philipp Oswald were the defending champions, but lost in the final to Austin Krajicek and Rajeev Ram, 6–7(4–7), 4–6.

Seeds

Draw

Draw

References
 Main Draw

Kremlin Cup - Men's Doubles
2018 Doubles